This listing article does not include "climbing pyramids" typically found in playgrounds.

List of pyramids in Ireland by location

References

Pyramids in Europe
Lists of buildings and structures in Ireland